Kartiki Gonsalves (born 2 November 1986, Ooty) is an Indian documentary filmmaker and photographer who directed the documentary film The Elephant Whisperers that won the Academy Award for Best Documentary Short Film at the 95th Academy Awards. She specialises in nature and wildlife photography and has been recognised by Sony as an Artisan of Imagery India.

Early life and education 

Kartiki is the younger daughter of Timothy A. Gonsalves and Priscilla Tapley Gonsalves, who is from Binghamton, New York.  She has one older sister, Danica Gonsalves.
She grew up in Ooty, within the Nilgiri Biosphere reserve in the Nilgiris district of Tamil Nadu.

She studied at the Dr G R Damodaran College of Science in Coimbatore and graduated in 2007, before continuing her studies, focusing on photography at Light & Life Academy, Ooty.

Career 

Gonsalves is documentary filmmaker and photographer who has worked as a camera operator for Animal Planet and the Discovery Channel. She is the director of the documentary film The Elephant Whisperers produced by Guneet Monga and Achin Jain and screened on Netflix. The 41-minute documentary was produced at the Theppakadu Elephant Camp, 30-minutes from where Gonsalves grew up. 

On March 13, 2023, the film won the Academy Award for Best Documentary Short Film at the 95th Academy Awards. It was the first Indian film to win the award.

Kartiki Gonsalves is a Sony Artisan of Imagery India since 2020, specialising in nature and social documentaries. She gives workshops on nature and wildlife photography and has conducted tours of Bangalore and Mysore cities. She travels widely for her work.

Gonsalves is an International League of Conservation Photographers Associate Fellow.

Major industry awards

See also 

 Conservation in India
 Tamil Nadu Forest Department

References

External links 
 Kartiki Gonsalves - Instagram
 Sony Alpha Photographers Interview, July 28 2022.
 Kartiki Gonsalves - LinkedIn
 Kartiki Gonsalves: Facebook

Living people
1986 births
Indian filmmakers
Indian women filmmakers
Indian women film directors
Documentary film directors
People from Mumbai
People from Ooty
Indian conservationists
21st-century Indian film directors
Tamil film directors
Film directors from Tamil Nadu
People from Nilgiris district
Directors of Best Documentary Short Subject Academy Award winners